"Don't Fear the Roofer" is the sixteenth episode of the sixteenth season of the American animated television series The Simpsons. It first aired on the Fox network in the United States on May 1, 2005, and guest-stars comedian Ray Romano and physicist Stephen Hawking. The episode is a parody of the 2001 film A Beautiful Mind.

Plot
A major thunderstorm hits Springfield, and Marge demands that Homer fix their leaking roof. Homer attempts to solve the problem by using Hot Wheels ramps to transport all the draining water from the roof to the front yard through the hallway, the stairway and the mail slot on the front door. Though this plan seems to work well, Lisa's hamster slides down the ramps to the front yard by accident. Shocked, Lisa opens the front door to save her hamster, breaking all the ramps, and leaving the house all wet, ruining Bart's preparations for the homework party and leaving Maggie's teddy bear ringing wet. Marge berates Homer for not providing a more sensible solution to fix the roof. Angered, Homer decides to go to Moe's Tavern, but is kicked out when he ruins Lenny's surprise birthday party and sits on his birthday cake by accident, shaped in the form of Lenny's favourite bar stool. Feeling depressed, Homer finds another bar, "Knockers" (a parody of the restaurant Hooters), where he meets a friendly man named Ray Magini. The two talk, and Homer finds out that Ray is a roofer, so Homer asks him to fix his leak. Ray agrees.

The next day, Homer assures Marge that his new friend will be taking care of the roof. Ray, however, does not arrive until everyone else has left. The two of them get up on the roof and use nail guns to nail the boards onto the roof, but they start shooting nails at each other, some hitting Ned Flanders' ride-on lawn mower next door. Ray leaves later and, as Homer runs on the roof to see him off, he crashes through the small part of the roof that they fixed, making the hole bigger. Meanwhile, Marge and the kids leave Santa's Little Helper with Grampa and the Springfield Retirement Home residents, because they seem to like him. When Marge sees the hole, she tells Homer to fix it himself, because she sees no reason to believe that his friend will.

The next day, Bart and Homer go to the Builder's Barn, and Homer meets Ray there. Ray apologizes to Homer for having not finished the job and promises he will stop by soon to work on the roof. Lisa, Marge, and Maggie arrive back at the retirement home, only to discover that Santa's Little Helper has become one of the old people. After Lisa succumbs to the same effect, they permanently take him back home. After waiting a long while for Ray to show on the roof, Marge becomes worried about Homer, and tells him that Ray is just a figment of his imagination. When Homer refuses to believe it, he falls off the roof and is knocked unconscious.

The next day, Homer awakens inside Calmwood Mental Hospital, having been admitted there by Marge. Dr. Hibbert tells him that Ray does not exist; he was created by Homer's mind as Homer was feeling lonely and unappreciated because of the previous events he had endured. All the people that Homer thinks saw Ray - Bart, Ned, and the "Knockers" bartender - claim they did not, and Lisa reveals that "Ray Magini" is an anagram for "imaginary". When Homer spots Ray outside from the window of his hospital room, Hibbert assigns him to "electro-shock" (or electroconvulsive therapy). Six weeks later, Homer is now sure that Ray does not exist. As he is being discharged, he sees Ray again in the room. Angered by the pain the "figment of his imagination" has caused him, he assaults him. In retaliation, Ray knocks Homer out and everyone is surprised they can see him too.

He did really exist the whole time: the bartender did not see Ray as he had an eye patch on (while looking in the direction of Homer and Ray that night, Ray was before his covered eye), and Ray could not be seen by Ned because he was behind the chimney. Bart still viewed Homer with skepticism for talking to thin air, but Stephen Hawking arrives and says that Bart could not see Ray at the hardware store because of a miniature black hole caused directly behind Ray which absorbed the light from Ray and made it look as though Homer was talking to himself when Homer was actually talking to Ray. Marge asks Ray why he started fixing the roof, and then just disappeared. Ray says he is a contractor. Everyone laughs, and Marge says "That's right, you're all crooks!" Hibbert, seeing how angry Homer is as he was made to go through shock treatment for nothing, offers to make it up to him by doing a free eye scraping for him. Homer agrees on it, but also forces Hibbert to fix the roof without any breaks while Ray and Homer discuss Everybody Loves Raymond on the roof during the credits.

Production
Although it was advertised as the 350th episode, it was actually the 351st episode to air ("Future-Drama" is the 350th and "The Heartbroke Kid" is the 352nd). The real 350th episode (in production code order) is "The Father, the Son, and the Holy Guest Star", which was temporarily shelved following the death of Pope John Paul II.

Cultural references
The title of the episode is a reference to the song "(Don't Fear) The Reaper" by Blue Öyster Cult. The song played over the end credits of "The Parent Rap".
Homer and Ray discuss guest star Ray Romano's sitcom Everybody Loves Raymond, which aired its final episode two weeks later. In the original airing of the episode, Ray begins telling Homer to watch the show "while you still can" as the episode ends, and keeps repeating to Homer when Everybody Loves Raymond airs (aired) on CBS, while Homer keeps messing up the day and time, during the closing credits. While some repeats have included this material, other viewings have edited out both parts because of Everybody Loves Raymonds having finished its network run long ago.

Edits
On the United Kingdom's Channel 4, and in American syndication on Fox affiliates, as well as on the season 16 DVD boxset release, the entire post-credit conversation between Homer and Ray about CBS's Everybody Loves Raymond was re-dubbed with the traditional end music for the show. However, when the episode aired on Sky1, the original end credits were used.

Reception
Screen Rant called it the best episode of the 16th season.

References

External links
 

The Simpsons (season 16) episodes
2005 American television episodes
Cultural depictions of Stephen Hawking